Ejler Andreas Christoffer Jorgensen aka Eiler  Jørgensen (July 16, 1838 – December 17, 1876) was a Danish-American landscape and portrait painter

Biography
Eiler Jørgensen was born in Sømme Herred in Roskilde, Denmark. He was the eldest son of parish priest Søren Hillerup Jørgensen (1806-1847) and Conradine van Deurs (1812-1890).  He was a student at the Royal Danish Academy of Fine Arts (Det Kongelige Danske Kunstakademi) in Copenhagen (1860). He relocated to the United States in 1873. He was professionally active in San Francisco in the 1870s. Jorgensen painted in Hawaii in 1875. He died in Oakland, California in 1876.

The Honolulu Museum of Art holds work by Ejler Andreas Jorgensen. Jorgensen signed some of his paintings "Chris Jorgensen", but should not be confused with the American-born painter of landscapes, missions, and marine scenes, Chris Jorgensen (1860–1935).

References

Other sources
 Ellis, George R. and Marcia Morse  (2000) A Hawaii Treasury, Masterpieces from the Honolulu Academy of Arts  (Tokyo: Asahi Shimbun, pages 147, 223)
 Forbes, David W.  (1992) Encounters with Paradise: Views of Hawaii and its People, 1778-1941  (Honolulu Academy of Arts,  page 167)

19th-century American painters
American male painters
19th-century Danish painters
Danish male painters
American portrait painters
Danish portrait painters
American landscape painters
People from Roskilde
Danish emigrants to the United States
1876 deaths
1838 births
19th-century American male artists
19th-century Danish male artists